Cassiano Mendes da Rocha or simply Cassiano (born 4 December 1975 in Porto Alegre) is a former Brazilian football player.

Honours
Grêmio
Brasileirão champion: 1996
Campeonato Gaúcho champion: 1995, 1996

Nacional
Uruguayan Primera División champion: 2002

External links
Profile by sambafoot

References

1975 births
Footballers from Porto Alegre
Living people
Brazilian footballers
Mogi Mirim Esporte Clube players
Grêmio Foot-Ball Porto Alegrense players
Sociedade Esportiva Palmeiras players
UD Logroñés players
Brazilian expatriate footballers
Expatriate footballers in Spain
São Paulo FC players
FC Elista players
Russian Premier League players
Expatriate footballers in Russia
FC Aarau players
Expatriate footballers in Switzerland
Toros Neza footballers
Expatriate footballers in Mexico
Club Nacional de Football players
Expatriate footballers in Uruguay
Pohang Steelers players
Expatriate footballers in South Korea
Al Shabab Al Arabi Club Dubai players
Expatriate footballers in the United Arab Emirates
Botafogo de Futebol e Regatas players
F.C. Penafiel players
Expatriate footballers in Portugal
C.D. Cuenca footballers
Expatriate footballers in Ecuador
Atlético Junior footballers
Expatriate footballers in Colombia
Hanoi FC players
V.League 1 players
Expatriate footballers in Vietnam
Rio Claro Futebol Clube players
Clube Atlético Sorocaba players
UAE Pro League players
Uruguayan Primera División players
Categoría Primera A players

Association football midfielders